Los Vendidos (Spanish for The Sold Ones or The Sellouts) is a one-act play by Chicano playwright Luis Valdez, a founding member of El Teatro Campesino. He wrote it in 1967, and it was first performed at the Brown Beret junta in Elysian Park, East Los Angeles. The play examines stereotypes of Latinos in California and how they are treated by local, state, and federal governments.

Plot
The short play is set in Honest Sancho's Used Mexican Lot and Mexican Curio Shop, a fictional Californian store that apparently sells various "models" (robots) of stereotypical Mexicans and Mexican-Americans that buyers can manipulate by simply snapping their fingers and calling out commands. The action of the play revolves around "The Secretary," a character by the name of Miss Jiménez, who converses with Honest Sancho, the owner of the store. Sancho says her name with Spanish pronunciation ( or, roughly), though she chastises him for speaking bad English, demanding that it be pronounced as the Anglicized  .

Miss Jiménez explains to the courteous Honest Sancho that she is a secretary for Governor Reagan and that his administration is looking to purchase "a Mexican type" to appeal to a lower income crowd. Sancho shows the Secretary four different models, snapping his fingers in order to bring them to life and demonstrate their behaviors. Although Miss Jiménez is herself evidently a Chicana (Mexican-American), she seems completely ignorant to the cultural stereotypes displayed in each of the four buyable characters.

First, Sancho shows her the sturdy Farm Worker, but she refuses to buy him because he speaks no English. Second, they examine the "Johnny Pachuco," a 1950s Chicano gang member model who is violent, profane, and drug-abusing, though an easy scapegoat and perfect to brutalize. Third, when Miss Jiménez asks for a more romantic model, they come to the Revolucionario, one of the glorified bandit/martyrs of early Californian history; however, she denies him when she learns that he is completely Mexican and not even American-made.

Finally, they come to the most contemporary Mexican-American model, named "Eric Garcia": a well-dressed and exciting public speaker who is university-educated, ambitious, bilingual, and polite. Miss Jiménez very reluctantly agrees to buy Eric for $15,000, when suddenly he begins staging a vocal protest in Spanish: "¡Viva la raza! ¡Viva la huelga! ¡Viva la revolución!" (Long live the people! Long live the strike! Long live the revolution!). Soon he snaps the three other models awake and they join in his miniature uprising. After Jiménez flees in fright, the four models converse among each other, revealing that they, in fact, are not robots, but rather, living human beings. They leave the lot and share the money amongst themselves, and Sancho stays still; it is he who is the robot. One of the people take him for an oil job and the play ends.

Analysis
Luiz Valdez wrote this play to enhance awareness to the different stereotypes in 1960 Americas, and how other people treated him. Luis Valdez himself was a Chicano and immigrant from Mexico. 

The Sellouts are people who sell out their culture and adapt to the culture of Americans. Valdez himself saw this as a huge problem to immigrant workers as it made people of his kind, who kept their culture, look bad. In this case, it is Miss Jimenez who was the Sellout.

Adaptation
Los Vendidos was adapted for television in 1972 by KNBC.

References

Sources

Luis Valdez - Early Works: Actors, Bernabe and Pensamiento Serpentino from Arte Publico Press in Houston, Texas, 1990.

External links
Watch the television adaptation of Los Vendidos at the Hemispheric Institute Digital Video Library, New York University

1967 plays
Plays by Luis Valdez
Hispanic and Latino American plays
Plays about race and ethnicity
Plays set in California
Political plays